The 2011 UEFS Futsal Women's Championship was the 5th women's UEFS futsal championship, held in Prague, (Czech Republic) from 5 December to 10 December.

There were 5 teams in the competition: Czech Republic, Russia, Catalonia, France and Italy. The championship was played in a league system and the Czech Republic won their second women's title in four years.

Championship

Final standings

References
Independent Futsal

External links
UEFS website

UEFS Futsal Women's Championship
UEFS
2011–12 in Czech football
International futsal competitions hosted by the Czech Republic